Runcorn Shopping City, formerly Halton Lea and Runcorn Shopping Centre, is a medium-sized indoor shopping centre in Runcorn, England. Opened by Queen Elizabeth II in 1972, it is the main shopping area in Runcorn and has over 125,000 visitors per week. It was the largest enclosed shopping centre in Europe at the time of its construction and remains the largest in Cheshire.

History

Construction and early years

Runcorn was designated as a New Town in 1964 and a masterplan drawn up which would see the town more than double in size. The site of the town centre for Runcorn New Town was a source of conflict between Arthur Ling, the New Town Master Planner, and Fred Roche, Chief Architect. Whereas Ling envisaged a centre reminiscent of a citadel or acropolis at the base of Halton Castle and at the geographical centre of the expanded town, Roche preferred to redevelop the existing town centre, partly to placate the Urban District Council and existing traders. Ling's vision was favoured and a greenfield site near Halton Village was chosen.

Shopping City was to be the centrepiece of Runcorn New Town. Ling, envisaged that it would become the "natural meeting place for the town's social and cultural life as well as for shopping, offices and specialised amenities such as theatre, library, central sports hall etc." It would also be linked to the new law courts, police station and general hospital.

Roche's design was influenced by the fully enclosed, drive-in shopping malls that had begun to emerge in North America in the 1960s. The former gives large spans and allows for flexible shop space without columns, and the latter is for services and vertical access points.

The building is raised on columns, partly to tackle the valley like topography, but also to allow the segregation of cars, buses and pedestrians on three different levels. Vehicles arrive at ground level, giving access to the four multi-storey car parks on each corner for customers and to the shop basements for deliveries. Pedestrians arrive at the shopping level using elevated walkways from neighbouring estates such as the radical but ill-fated Southgate Estate. Buses arrive at the highest level on an elevated busway, the world's first bus rapid transit system, which circles the town in a figure of 8 with Shopping City at the centre.

Construction began in 1968 by John Laing Group, commissioned by Grosvenor Estate Commercial Developments Limited and the Runcorn Development Corporation.  The build cost £10 million and was privately financed by Grosvenor. The centre was completed by 1971 and Runcorn Shopping City was officially opened by Queen Elizabeth II on 5 May 1972.

Shopping City and all of its surrounding ancillary buildings were encased in brilliant white tiles which were chosen to be self-cleansing; their crisp whiteness contrasting with the hill to the north and the trees and dense planting which would come to surround it. On its opening, The Times commented that, 'Shopping City is possibly the nearest planners have come to the sort of building imagined by science fiction writers. In appearance, it resembles a supersonic mosque, with gleaming white bricks even on the dullest day'. It also noted the 'clarity of the design of shops, malls and public squares' and the 'spacious, beautifully lighted shops'.

The interior was finished with white terrazzo floor tiles throughout and Sicilian marble lining the walls, columns and shop fronts. The shops are laid out along malls in an H formation, with the 'Town Square' in the centre. There is a second storey around the square intended for restaurants and bars.

At the time of its opening, it was the largest fully enclosed shopping centre in Europe. Served by excellent transport links, not just within Runcorn itself (including the town's innovative busway system), but also with surrounding towns and cities, it quickly established itself as a premier shopping destination. By the early 1980s all the units were fully let and new town residents recall the four multi-storey car parks - 2,200 spaces - as being almost full in the early days.

Neglect and decline

The centre's early success at attracting huge numbers of shoppers, brought in by Runcorn's unique transportation system and its central location between Manchester and Liverpool, did not last as the owners at that time, Grosvenor, pushed rents up in an attempt to capitalise on the centre's popularity. Spiralling rents soon saw many of the big names close and move to centres with lower rents.

The centre was bought by Fordgate Midland Properties Limited in January 1989 but a dispute arose about the property's condition at the time of sale. The previous owners, Grosvenor, had contracted with Laing to encapsulate asbestos in the roof voids and decontaminate those areas in 1988. This became the source of legal disputes between the three parties since Fordgate alleged that Grosvenor had, in the words of Lord Justice Saville, "fraudulently or negligently misrepresented the true condition of the premises so that the Appellants were induced to purchase the premises, believing them to contain treated and encapsulated asbestos when, in fact, the roof voids were dreadfully...contaminated with loose asbestos fibre".

Fordgate undertook significant works to remove asbestos, replace and lower the original suspended ceiling, block up sky lights and replace damaged floor tiles and expansion joints, culminating with a rebranding in 1995 to Halton Lea Shopping Centre. In 1999, Fordgate used vacant land to the south of the centre, which had originally been intended for leisure and cultural use, to create a  outdoor shopping park named Trident Retail Park, including a 9-screen cinema complex.

Halton Lea was taken into receivership in September 2009 which was managed by Savills, though the centre continued to operate as normal. In September 2010, the centre was put up for sale and on 24 March 2011 it was announced that the centre had been sold to F&C Reit (since rebranded BMO Real Estate Partners) for approximately £29.1 million using an offshore company, Runcorn One Ltd, registered in Guernsey.

However, Fordgate retained ownership of one of the four multi-storey car parks and, in August 2011, attained planning permission to build a 148,348 sq ft superstore adjoining the shopping centre in place of the multi-storey car park, East Lane House and a Territorial Army Centre. Fordgate had said they would pay for a replacement TA Centre elsewhere in the town and the plan was approved by Halton Borough Council, despite objections from the new owners of the Shopping City. The scheme did not go ahead and by November 2014 the fourth car park was also under the ownership of BMO. Trident Retail Park was also sold separately from the enclosed shopping centre and in April 2014 was acquired by KWE.

Investment and renewal

In summer 2012, plans were announced for the renovation of the exterior of the building and three of the four multi-storey car parks to the designs of architects Leach Rhodes Walker of Manchester. The total sum invested by BMO exceeded £3 million. The exterior had not been modified significantly since the building's original construction in the 1970s, and in 2010, a net was fitted around the building to stop detaching tiles from falling. In October 2013, following the renovation, the centre was re-branded to Runcorn Shopping Centre. Also in 2013, the surrounding area saw new investment by developer Opus Land North with the construction of a new Lidl, Burger King, garages and a car dealership on the site of the former Vestric House.

A setback occurred in April 2015 when Tesco, one of the centre's anchor tenants, announced it was closing several stores across the UK, including its Runcorn store. Tesco had operated a large supermarket in the shopping centre since the 1970s. The floor-space had been reduced in the early 2000s and the store rebranded as a Tesco Metro. The large Tesco unit was not long vacant when The Range announced in August the same year that they were to open a new store in the same units.

Despite its many name changes, most Runcorn residents continued to call it by its original name of Runcorn Shopping City; it reverted to its original name for its 45th birthday in July 2017. Its new logo, inspired by original signage, was created by John Saunders.

In August 2017, as part of a demerger, the centre was transferred to Capreon before entering administration in 2019.

Shops and services

Runcorn Shopping City comprises over 60 stores. Originally anchored by Littlewoods and Woolworths. For some time the main anchor store was The Range but they closed their doors at the end of February 2021. This unit is currently (April 2021) empty. The centre also hosts many smaller retailers and has introduced an incubator for local start up outlets in 'The Box'.

The centre is also complemented by surrounding developments, including large supermarkets, drive through fast food restaurants, and the adjacent Trident Retail Park and its multiplex cinema. Local amenities like the main library and Council 'Direct Link' centres are also attached to the Shopping City in the civic quarter.

Future development
In April 2018, Halton Borough Council unveiled concept plans for the regeneration of the area surrounding and adjoining the Shopping City under the theme, 'Halton Healthy New Town'. The centrepiece of this plan had been the reconstruction of the neighbouring Halton General Hospital site but funding from central government programmes was denied and the wider regeneration plans stalled.

Following the centre entering receivership in 2019, Savills appointed RivingtonHark to work with Halton Borough Council and asset management company ICG Longbow to develop the site into a 'mixed use retail, lifestyle and wellness centre.'

Location and transport
The Shopping City was built as a central focus for the New Town centre, and a civic quarter was built adjoining the centre which includes a library, police station and local government offices. Halton General Hospital is also nearby.

The centre is also complemented by surrounding developments, including large supermarkets, drive through fast food restaurants, and the adjacent Trident Retail Park and its multiplex cinema.

The Old Town area of Runcorn with its Brindley Theatre is a few minutes drive away and the shopping centre is overlooked by the historic Halton Castle.

It has a core catchment population of 120,000.

Bus

Runcorn Shopping City is serviced by two bus stations which provide both local and regional services across Runcorn, Widnes, Warrington, Huyton, Chester and Liverpool. Both stations are integrated with the Shopping City with indoor waiting areas.

Shopping City is the main bus interchange for the town and its unique system of dedicated busways.

Road
The Shopping City sits alongside the A533, the main route north to Widnes and Liverpool across the Mersey Gateway Bridge. To the south is the nearby M56 motorway to Manchester, Chester and North Wales. Warrington, Northwich and Frodsham are a short drive away.

The centre has four multi-storey car parks containing 2,200 spaces. Car parking is free and each car park features disabled and infant & parent spots close to the entrances on the shopping level.

Rail
Two major railway stations are nearby, both of which are a short commute away.

Runcorn provides services north to Liverpool Lime Street and south to Birmingham New Street and London Euston.

Runcorn East connects Manchester Piccadilly, Warrington Bank Quay, Frodsham, Helsby, Chester and North Wales.

See also
 List of shopping centres in the United Kingdom

References

Shopping centres in Cheshire
Buildings and structures in Runcorn
1972 establishments in England
Shopping malls established in 1972